Apiwat Saisoi (Thai อภิวัฒน์ สายสร้อย) is a Thai footballer. He currently plays for PTT FC in the Thai Division 1 League.

External links
Profile at Thaipremierleague.co.th

1983 births
Living people
Apiwat Saisoi
Association football defenders
Apiwat Saisoi
Apiwat Saisoi
Apiwat Saisoi